Nutt Bluff is a rock bluff rising to about 1,315 m southeast of Alley Spur, Dufek Massif. Named by Advisory Committee on Antarctic Names (US-ACAN) at the suggestion of Arthur B. Ford, leader of the United States Geological Survey (USGS) geological party in the Dufek Massif, 1976–77, after Constance J. Nutt, geologist, Stanford University, Stanford, CA, a member of the USGS party.

Cliffs of Queen Elizabeth Land